Abercrombie is a city in Richland County, North Dakota, United States. The population was 244 at the 2020 census. Abercrombie was founded in 1884.

History
Abercrombie was founded in 1884. It was named after Fort Abercrombie, a local military installation adjacent to the city.  This means the city indirectly received its name from Lieutenant Colonel Abercrombie, first commanding officer of the fort.  The city is part of the military reservation and is located on section 4, 134–48.

Abercrombie did not come into being until 1884, when Fargo and Southern Railroad was built through the Red River Valley along the Red River.  Then directly west of the old fort, the town of Abercrombie was started.

Geography
Abercrombie is located at  (46.447182, -96.729487).

Demographics

Abercrombie is part of the Wahpeton, ND MN Micropolitan Statistical Area.

2010 census
As of the census of 2010, there were 263 people, 104 households, and 68 families residing in the city. The racial makeup of the city was 98.5% White, 0.4% African American, 0.8% Native American, and 0.4% from two or more races. Hispanic or Latino of any race were 0.4% of the population.

There were 104 households, of which 37.5% had children under the age of 18 living with them, 52.9% were married couples living together, 8.7% had a female householder with no husband present, 3.8% had a male householder with no wife present, and 34.6% were non-families. 31.7% of all households were made up of individuals, and 16.4% had someone living alone who was 65 years of age or older. The average household size was 2.53 and the average family size was 3.15.

The median age in the city was 35.8 years. 30.4% of residents were under the age of 18; 5.4% were between the ages of 18 and 24; 25.9% were from 25 to 44; 25.8% were from 45 to 64; and 12.5% were 65 years of age or older. The gender makeup of the city was 48.7% male and 51.3% female.

2000 census
As of the census of 2000, there were 296 people, 118 households, and 73 families residing in the city. The racial makeup of the city was 96.62% White, 1.35% Native American, 0.34% Asian, and 1.69% from two or more races.

The top 6 ancestry groups in the city are Norwegian (54.4%), German (41.9%), Irish (12.8%), Swedish (12.2%), English (7.4%), Czech (6.8%).

There were 118 households, out of which 35.6% had children under the age of 18 living with them, 54.2% were married couples living together, 5.1% had a female householder with no husband present, and 38.1% were non-families. 33.1% of all households were made up of individuals, and 9.3% had someone living alone who was 65 years of age or older. The average household size was 2.51 and the average family size was 3.27.

In the city, the population was spread out, with 32.1% under the age of 18, 6.4% from 18 to 24, 31.8% from 25 to 44, 18.9% from 45 to 64, and 10.8% who were 65 years of age or older. The median age was 33 years. For every 100 females, there were 124.2 males. For every 100 females age 18 and over, there were 113.8 males.

The median income for a household in the city was $34,167, and the median income for a family was $37,125. Males had a median income of $30,000 versus $17,321 for females. The per capita income for the city was $13,911. About 8.8% of families and 13.8% of the population were below the poverty line, including 19.5% of those under the age of eighteen and none of those 65 or over.

Economy
The economy of Abercrombie is surrounded by agriculture.  While agriculture does play the dominant role in the southern Red River Valley, the city of Abercrombie provides employment in sectors such as education, telecommunication, and manufacturing.

Largest Employers
 Red River Communications
 North Land Truss Systems, Inc.
 Richland #44 School District

Culture
Many of the settlers who came from Norway, Sweden and Denmark in the late 1860s and early 1870s came first to Wisconsin and southern Minnesota to work in the Lumber mills.  While there, they heard much about the Red River Valley and its fertility and great possibility.  At this time a Mr. Strandvold was writing articles geared towards appealing to young Norsemen with the intention of drawing them to the Valley.

Education
The city of Abercrombie is served by the Richland 44 School District, which contains 2 schools:
Elementary School (Preschool-6)
Richland Elementary School
Junior/Senior High School (7-12)
Richland Junior/Senior High School

Climate
This climatic region is typified by large seasonal temperature differences, with warm to hot (and often humid) summers and cold (sometimes severely cold) winters.  According to the Köppen Climate Classification system, Abercrombie has a humid continental climate, abbreviated "Dfb" on climate maps.

References

Cities in North Dakota
Cities in Richland County, North Dakota
Populated places established in 1884
1884 establishments in Dakota Territory
Wahpeton micropolitan area